Crenshaw is a town in Panola and Quitman counties in the U.S. state of Mississippi. The population was 885 at the 2010 census.

History
Crenshaw was located on the Yazoo and Mississippi Valley Railroad.  By the early 1900s, Crenshaw had a post office, several stores, churches, schools, and a combined oil mill and cotton-gin.  The Bank of Crenshaw was established in 1905.

Geography
Most of the town is in Panola County with a small portion on the west side in Quitman County. In the 2000 census, 697 of the town's 916 residents (76.1%) lived in Panola County and 219 (23.9%) in Quitman County.

According to the United States Census Bureau, the town has a total area of 0.4 square mile (1.1 km2), all land.

Demographics

2020 census

As of the 2020 United States Census, there were 638 people, 351 households, and 239 families residing in the town.

2010 census
As of the 2010 United States Census, there were 885 people living in the town. 77.2% were African American, 21.6% White, 0.1% Native American, 0.8% from some other race and 0.3% from two or more races. 0.8% were Hispanic or Latino of any race.

2000 census
As of the census of 2000, there were 916 people, 339 households, and 244 families living in the town. The population density was 2,213.0 people per square mile (862.6/km2). There were 385 housing units at an average density of 930.1 per square mile (362.6/km2). The racial makeup of the town was  71.51% African American, 27.84% White, 0.55% Native American and 0.11% Asian. Hispanic or Latino of any race were 0.55% of the population.

There were 339 households, out of which 33.9% had children under the age of 18 living with them, 42.2% were married couples living together, 25.1% had a female householder with no husband present, and 28.0% were non-families. 26.5% of all households were made up of individuals, and 11.2% had someone living alone who was 65 years of age or older. The average household size was 2.70 and the average family size was 3.23.

In the town, the population was spread out, with 30.6% under the age of 18, 9.7% from 18 to 24, 26.6% from 25 to 44, 20.3% from 45 to 64, and 12.8% who were 65 years of age or older. The median age was 32 years. For every 100 females, there were 89.3 males. For every 100 females age 18 and over, there were 81.7 males.

The median income for a household in the town was $20,781, and the median income for a family was $23,393. Males had a median income of $22,727 versus $17,768 for females. The per capita income for the town was $10,372. About 29.0% of families and 28.7% of the population were below the poverty line, including 33.8% of those under age 18 and 24.0% of those age 65 or over.

Education
The Panola County portion of Crenshaw is served by the North Panola School District. Crenshaw Elementary School in Crenshaw, North Panola Junior High School in Como, and North Panola High School in Sardis serve the community. The Quitman County School District serves the portion of Crenshaw that lies in Quitman County.

Notable people
 Gene Lambert, professional baseball player

References

Towns in Panola County, Mississippi
Towns in Quitman County, Mississippi
Towns in Mississippi